The Philippines competed in the 1990 Asian Winter Games which were held in Sapporo, Japan from March 9, 1990 to March 14, 1990.

Alpine skiing

The Philippines had one male athlete in alpine skiing.

References

Asian Winter Games
Nations at the 1990 Asian Winter Games
Philippines at the Asian Winter Games